Kom is the fourth studio album by the Swedish singer-songwriter Lars Winnerbäck, released in 1999. "Kom ihåg mig då" and "Söndag 13.3.99" were released as singles. Winnerbäck later won a Grammis for "Best songwriter" for the album.

Track listing
"Kom", Come
"Kom ihåg mig", Remember Me
"I Stockholm", In Stockholm
"Du får mig", You Can Have Me
"Du gamla fria nord" (Original by Ani DiFranco)
"Måste vara två", Got to Be Two
"Aldrig riktigt slut", Never Really Over
"Hugger i sten", Go Wide of the Mark
"Söndag 13.3.99", Sunday 13.3.99
"Tanken som räknas", It's the Thought That Counts
"Nästan perfekt", Almost Perfect
"Fria vägar ut", Free Ways Out

Charts

References 

1999 albums
Lars Winnerbäck albums